Louisiana Highway 17 (LA 17) is a state highway located in northeastern Louisiana.  It runs  in a north–south direction from the junction of U.S. Highway 425 (US 425), LA 4, LA 15, and LA 130 in Winnsboro to the Arkansas state line at Kilbourne.

LA 17 traverses a mostly rural area on an alignment roughly midway between the parallel US 65 and US 425 corridors.  Heading northeast from Winnsboro, the seat of Franklin Parish, LA 17 connects a number of tiny communities located on the west side of Bayou Macon.  After crossing into Richland Parish, the highway passes through the town of Delhi and straightens to follow alongside the abandoned right-of-way of the Missouri Pacific Railroad.  The northern half of LA 17 functions as the main north–south highway through West Carroll Parish, connecting the villages of Epps, Pioneer, Forest, and Kilbourne, as well as the parish seat of Oak Grove.

In Delhi, LA 17 connects with both Interstate 20 (I-20) and US 80, providing access to the ancient Native American earthworks at Poverty Point State Historic Site and National Monument.  This site is located along LA 134 just east of Epps and was designated as a UNESCO World Heritage Site in 2014.

LA 17 was created in the 1955 Louisiana Highway renumbering, replacing the former State Route 16, one of the original 98 state highway designations assigned in 1921.

Route description

Winnsboro to Delhi
From the south, LA 17 begins at a junction of five numbered highways located at the four-way intersection of Front Street, Kinloch Street, and Taylor Avenue in Winnsboro.  US 425/LA 15 passes through this intersection on Front Street, the city's main thoroughfare, en route to Monroe on the north.  To the south, US 425/LA 15 travels toward Natchez, Mississippi running briefly concurrent with westbound LA 4.  Opposite the southern terminus of LA 17, LA 130 begins and heads west on Taylor Avenue toward Liddieville.  From this junction, LA 17 heads east on Kinloch Street, an undivided two-lane thoroughfare, running concurrent with eastbound LA 4.  After a few blocks, the highway makes a zigzag onto Main Street and widens to an undivided four-lane highway with a center turning lane.

Just outside the city limits, the roadway curves to the northeast while LA 4 turns off to the southeast toward Newellton.  Returning to two-lane capacity, LA 17 proceeds through rural Franklin Parish.  After , the highway passes through the small community of Crowville and intersects several minor state highways, including LA 577, which connects to Baskin on the west.  Over the remaining  in Franklin Parish, LA 17 continues northeast through rural farmland and intersects several more minor highways, including LA 132 to Mangham.

Delhi to Arkansas state line
After crossing into Richland Parish, LA 17 passes Delhi Municipal Airport and enters the town of Delhi.  Widening to four lanes, the highway passes through a diamond interchange with I-20, connecting with Monroe to the west and Vicksburg, Mississippi to the east.  Traveling through the center of town on Broadway Street, LA 17 crosses the Kansas City Southern Railway (KCS) line at grade and intersects US 80 (1st Street).  North of town, LA 17 intersects LA 854 and passes Poverty Point Reservoir State Park.  After passing through the tiny community of Warden, LA 17 crosses into West Carroll Parish at Mitchiner and a junction with LA 877.

In West Carroll Parish, LA 17 proceeds northeast through the village of Epps.  A junction with LA 134 here leads to the ancient Native American earthworks of the Poverty Point State Historic Site and National Monument, one of only 23 UNESCO World Heritage Sites in the United States.  Over the next , LA 17 passes through the rural communities of Darnell, Pioneer, and Forest before reaching the town of Oak Grove, the seat of West Carroll Parish.  LA 17 heads north into town on Constitution Avenue and widens to an undivided four-lane highway with a center turning lane.  In the center of Oak Grove, LA 17 intersects LA 2 (Main Street), connecting with Lake Providence to the east and Bastrop to the west.  These are the seats of neighboring East Carroll and Morehouse parishes, respectively.

North of Oak Grove, LA 17 narrows to an undivided two-lane highway once again.  After passing the tiny rural communities of Terry and Chickasaw, the highway enters the village of Kilbourne.  Traveling on Kilbourne Avenue, LA 17 reaches its final junction, LA 585 (Louisiana Avenue).  The highway ends  later at the Arkansas state line, where the road continues towards Eudora, Arkansas as Arkansas Highway 159 (AR 159).

Route classification and data
LA 17 is classified by the Louisiana Department of Transportation and Development (La DOTD) as an urban minor arterial in the Winnsboro area and as a rural minor arterial otherwise. Daily traffic volume in 2013 peaked at 9,800 vehicles in Winnsboro and 10,300 at the I-20 interchange in Delhi. Most of the route averaged under 4,000 vehicles daily with a low of 1,930 reported north of Epps.

History

Pre-1955 route numbering

In the original Louisiana Highway system in use between 1921 and 1955, LA 17 was designated as State Route 16.  It was created in 1921 by an act of the state legislature as one of the first 98 state highway routes.

The western terminus of Route 16 was originally located just outside Winnsboro at the present junction of LA 4/LA 17 and LA 864.  Route 15, which retained its number in the 1955 Louisiana Highway renumbering, followed the path of current LA 864 and LA 4/LA 17 through town at this time.  In the early 1940s, Front Street was completed along the now-abandoned Missouri Pacific Railroad line, streamlining the path of Route 15 through Winnsboro.  The Route 16 designation was then extended west into town to maintain its junction with Route 15.

The entirety of Route 16 was surfaced with gravel by the mid-1920s.  In 1930, a short section of the route through Oak Grove was hard-surfaced.  Paving was completed south from Oak Grove to Delhi in 1932 and north from Oak Grove to Kilbourne in 1936.  The remainder of Route 16 between Winnsboro and Delhi was paved in 1941.

Post-1955 route history
LA 17 was created in 1955 as a direct renumbering of former Route 16.

Since the 1955 renumbering, very few changes have been made to the alignment of LA 17.  During the late 1980s, a curve was smoothed out between LA 132 and the Franklin–West Carroll parish line.  McDowell Road, a local road, is a remnant of the original alignment there.  About this same time, a more significant improvement was carried out that streamlined the route through Oak Grove.  The original route followed the Missouri Pacific Railroad to the center of town then made a zigzag east onto Main Street and north onto Briggs Street to rejoin the railroad line and the current alignment.  After the abandonment of the MoPac line, the four-lane Constitution Avenue alignment was constructed upon its right-of-way.

Major intersections

See also

References

External links

Maps / GIS Data Homepage, Louisiana Department of Transportation and Development

0017
Transportation in Franklin Parish, Louisiana
Transportation in Richland Parish, Louisiana
Transportation in West Carroll Parish, Louisiana